Étienne Jean Marie Flandin (1 April 1853 – 20 September 1922) was a French magistrate and politician who was twice deputy of Yonne, and was then Senator of French India from 1909 to 1920.

Early years (1853–93)

Étienne Jean Marie Flandin was born on 1 April 1853 in Paris.
The Flandin family originated in Domecy-sur-Cure.
His parent were Charles Flandin (1803-1887), doctor of medicine, and Aline de Sonis (1823-1857).
Charles Flandin supported the Republican opposition during the Second French Empire and became vice-president of the General Council of Yonne.
Etienne Flandin attended the Lycée Saint-Louis for his secondary education.
He studied law in Paris, where he earned a doctorate.

In 1876 Flandin married Pauline Ribière.
He became a professor of civil law at the Faculty of Algiers.
He lectured at the Faculty of Algiers from 1880 to 1882.
He was Advocate-General at Pau from 1882 to 1887.
He was a substitute in Paris from 1887 to 1889, then Attorney General in Algiers from 1889 to 1893.
He became a member of the General Council of Yonne.

Deputy (1893–1909)

Flandin was elected on 3 September 1893 as Republican candidate for the Avallon constitutuency of Yonne.
He won 5,700 votes in the second round of voting against 4,496 for the Radical candidate, Albert Gallot(fr).
He sat with the Republican Union parliamentary group.
He ran for reelection in 1898 but was defeated by Gallot.
He left office on 31 May 1898.

In 1902 Flandin won election as deputy of Yonne by 5,768 votes against 5,070 for Gallot.
He again sat with the Republican Union group, and was president of this group during the 8th legislature (1902–06).
He submitted several legislative proposals concerning the judiciary, taxation and proportional representation in elections.
In 1904 he was chairman of a committee to investigate suppression of congregational education.
In 1905 he participated in the debate on the law of separation of church and state, which he supported.

Flandin was reelected on 6 May 1906.
He won 5,802 votes against 4,000 for the Radical Socialist Paul Degouy(fr).
On 20 January 1908 Flandin proposed a revision of "the penal laws concerning vagrancy and begging, the organization of assistance through work and the supervision of nomads exercising itinerant professions."
He proposed that non-nationals should be required to carry a booklet that would be used to record and control their movement.

Senator (1909–22)

On 3 January 1909 Flandin was elected senator for French India by 85 votes against 20 for the incumbent  Jules Godin.
He was admitted to the senate on 30 March 1909 and resigned from the chamber of deputies on 2 April 1909.
He was a member of the Republican Union group.
He was a member of many special committees, and was often their president or rapporteur.
These included committees on the colonial customs regime, economic blockade of Germany, and offenses against the external security of France.
He gave numerous speeches on subjects such as extradition between France and Britain, voting secrecy and wards of the nation.
In the legislative elections of 1914 Flandin gave his support to Paul Bluysen as deputy for French India.
Bluysen won by a large majority.

At the start of World War I (1914–18) the penalty for desertion in face of the enemy was death.
Flandin pointed out that the high rates of acquittal in 1914 and 1915 were probably due to reluctance of judges to apply such a severe sentence.
After the law of 27 April 1916 gave the judges more flexibility in punishment, the number of convictions for desertion rose.
On 29 March 1918, during a difficult phase of the war, the Senate decided to review a proposed change to the code of military justice of 3 October 1916.
As rapporteur, Flandin stated that this was not the time to reopen the question, and that the need for discipline must be addressed as well as the demand for justice that had been formulated by the Chamber a few months earlier.
The senators followed Flandin in agreeing on the principle of a secret ballot and the freedom of the accused to communication with his defense council, but refused to increase the number of judges on the tribunals from five to seven.

Flandin was president of the Muslim section of the Parliamentary Committee on Foreign Affairs.
He was secretary of the Committee for French Affairs in Syria in 1916.
During the war one of the issues was that Muslim soldiers and "unbelievers" were interred together in mass graves.
As president of the Committee on Foreign Affairs Flandin warned Aristide Briand in September 1916 that, "Our enemies could not find a subject more likely to overexcite Muslim fanaticism.
In 1917 Flandin criticized conscription of Algerian troops, since it thought it wrong to force the indigenous people to accept French practices and ideals.
He thought it would be better to use a militia system based on local tribal organization, so the indigène could "evolve not in our civilization, but in his own."

On 26 October 1918 Flandin was appointed temporary Resident General in Tunis.
He was given this post by Georges Clemenceau before the armistice had been signed.
As the official representative of the French government in Tunisia, he directed the protectorate's administration.
He followed the policy of his predecessor, Gabriel Alapetite, in reorganization of indigenous justice and development of the railways.
He also created the Public Health and Hygiene administration to fight tuberculosis, typhus and syphilis.
He implemented a Water Code for new irrigation projects, which would lead to more intense agricultural production.
He was relieved of his functions in Tunisia on 1 January 1921, and returned to France to resume his activity as senator.

Due to the war Flandin's term as senator was extended to 18 January 1920.
On that date he was reelected to the senate by 100 votes against 4 for his opponent Martineau.
Flandin died on 20 September 1922 in Paris.
He was a Knight of the Legion of Honour and an Officer of the Académie française.

Publications
Publications by Étienne Flandin include:

Parliamentary reports by Flandin included:

Notes

Sources

1853 births
1920 deaths
Politicians from Paris
French republicans
Members of the 6th Chamber of Deputies of the French Third Republic
Members of the 8th Chamber of Deputies of the French Third Republic
Members of the 9th Chamber of Deputies of the French Third Republic
French Senators of the Third Republic
Senators of Yonne
French colonial governors and administrators
French general councillors
French magistrates